Huallaga may refer to:

Locations in Peru:
Huallaga Province
Huallaga River
Huallaga Valley